Northside High School or North Side High School or Northside Christian School or similar can refer to:

United States

Alabama
Northside High School (Northport, Alabama), a high school in Alabama
Northside Methodist Academy (Dothan, Alabama)

Arkansas
Northside High School (Fort Smith, Arkansas)

Florida
Havana Northside High School, Havana, Florida
Northside Christian School (St. Petersburg, Florida), a high school in Florida

Georgia
Northside High School, which merged into North Atlanta High School, Atlanta, Georgia
Northside High School (Columbus, Georgia)
Northside High School (Warner Robins, Georgia)

Illinois
Northside College Preparatory High School, Chicago, Illinois

Indiana
North Side High School (Fort Wayne, Indiana)

Louisiana
Northside High School (Lafayette, Louisiana)

Mississippi
Northside High School (Mississippi), in Shelby
Northside School (Mississippi), a landmark in Clay County, Mississippi

Montana
Northside School (Montana), on the National Register of Historic Places in Park County, Montana

North Carolina
Northside Christian Academy, Charlotte, North Carolina
Northside High School (Jacksonville, North Carolina)
Northside High School (Pinetown, North Carolina)

Ohio
Northside Christian School, Westerville, Ohio

South Carolina
Northside Christian School (North Charleston, SC), North Charleston, South Carolina

Tennessee
North Side High School (Jackson, Tennessee)
Northside High School (Memphis, Tennessee)

Texas
John Marshall High School (Leon Valley, Texas) (formerly Northside High School), Leon Valley, Texas
North Side High School (Fort Worth, Texas)
Northside School (Fargo, Texas)
Northside High School (Houston), Texas

Virginia
Northside High School (Roanoke, Virginia)

Washington
 North Side High School, former name of Whatcom Middle School, Washington

See also
Northside Middle School (disambiguation)